P120 is a solid-fuel first-stage rocket motor developed by Avio and ArianeGroup through the joint venture Europropulsion on behalf of European Space Agency for use on Vega C and Ariane 6.

"C" in P120C stands for "Common" as it will be shared by Ariane 6 and Vega-C.

In July 2022, with its inaugural flight, it replaced its predecessor P80 as the world's largest and most powerful one-piece solid-fuel rocket motor.

History 
The production of P120C was originally planned to be shared by the main Avio facility in Colleferro, Italy and by OHB-owned MT Aerospace facility of Augsburg, Germany. At the 17–18 May 2018 meeting of the ESA launcher program board in it was decided the production of P120C will be done in its full capacity in Italy. Mt Aerospace will instead produce turbo pumps for the upcoming Ariane 6 rocket originally awarded to Avio.

The first test firing of P120C was carried out on 16 July 2018 on the BEAP test bench at the Europe's spaceport Guiana Space Centre in Kourou, French Guiana. No anomalies were seen and the performance met expectations.

On 28 January 2019 a second test firing of 135 seconds at the Guiana Space Centre qualificated the P120C rocket motor for flight.

The second qualification model of the P120C solid rocket motor, configured for Ariane 6, completed its hot firing on 7 October 2020 at Europe's Spaceport in French Guiana.

Overview 
The P120C rocket motor is derived from the first stage of the Vega rocket P80. Like its predecessor, the structural casing is made of carbon fibre, which is built from pre-impregnated epoxy sheets through filament winding and automatic fabric deposition. It will contain 143.6 tons of HTPB 1912 solid propellant composed by 19% of aluminium powder, 69% of ammonium perchlorate with 12% of hydroxyl terminated polybutadiene binder.

The finished launcher will carry 143 tonnes of solid fuel and produce an average of 4.5 MN of thrust.

P120C+ 
In 2022, development of a stretched P120C+ version was announced to supersede the original on both the Ariane 6 and Vega-C, this extends the length of the solid booster by one meter adding 14 tons of extra propellant and increases LEO lift performance of the Ariane 64 by approximately 2 tons. 16 of the 18 contracted Kuiper launches are planned to utilize the P120C+ booster.

See also

 P80 (rocket stage)
 Zefiro (rocket stage)
 Solid rocket
 Vega (rocket)

References

Rocket stages
Solid-fuel rockets